Pandramaikos Football Club is a Greek football club based in Drama, Greece.

History
The club was established in 1969 after a merger of two local teams - Aris (established in 1926) and Elpida (established in 1922).

Pandramaikos have previously played at the Second Division, spending a total of ten seasons at that level.

The club currently plays at Fourth Division (Group 1).

Stadium
The club plays its home games at the Municipal Stadium of Drama, which has a capacity of 4,500.

Crest and colours
The club colours are red and white.

Players

Current squad

External links
Official Website 
Πανδραμαικός Α.Ο. Facebook Official Page

Drama, Greece
Football clubs in Eastern Macedonia and Thrace
1969 establishments in Greece
Association football clubs established in 1969
Gamma Ethniki clubs